Idiocnemis bidentatais a species of damselfly in the family Platycnemididae. It is endemic to Indonesia, where it is known only from the province of Papua on the island of New Guinea. It is mostly limited to the Bird's Head Peninsula.

Males of the species have an abdomen up to 3.4 centimeters long; the females are slightly smaller. Males are brown to black in color with yellow markings and females are similar in color.

Little is known about the biology of the species.

References

Platycnemididae
Endemic fauna of Indonesia
Insects described in 1878